Brachydesmus is a genus of millipedes belonging to the family Polydesmidae. Millipedes in this genus are found mainly in Europe. Species in this genus have only 19 segments as adults (counting the collum, the telson, and the rings in between), one fewer than found in most polydesmid species. Accordingly, adults in this genus have two fewer legs than most polydesmid adults have: Females have only 29 pairs of legs, and males have only 28 pairs of walking legs, excluding one pair of gonopods. Species in this genus arrive at these lower numbers of legs and segments by going through the same stages of teloanamorphosis observed in other polydesmids but reaching maturity one moult earlier.

Species
Species within this genus include: 

 Brachydesmus absoloni
 Brachydesmus amblyotropis
 Brachydesmus apfelbecki
 Brachydesmus assimilis
 Brachydesmus attemsi
 Brachydesmus attemsii
 Brachydesmus attenuatus
 Brachydesmus avalae
 Brachydesmus bebekensis
 Brachydesmus bidentatus
 Brachydesmus bosniensis
 Brachydesmus camerani
 Brachydesmus carniolensis
 Brachydesmus cernagoranus
 Brachydesmus chyzeri
 Brachydesmus cornuatus
 Brachydesmus cristofer
 Brachydesmus croaticus
 Brachydesmus dadayi
 Brachydesmus dadayii
 Brachydesmus dalmaticus
 Brachydesmus doboiensis
 Brachydesmus dolinensis
 Brachydesmus dorsolucidus
 Brachydesmus exiguus
 Brachydesmus ferrugineus
 Brachydesmus filiformis
 Brachydesmus frangipanus
 Brachydesmus frondicola
 Brachydesmus furcatus
 Brachydesmus glabrimarginalis
 Brachydesmus hastatus
 Brachydesmus henrikenghoffi
 Brachydesmus herzegowinensis
 Brachydesmus histricus
 Brachydesmus incisus
 Brachydesmus inferus
 Brachydesmus insculptus
 Brachydesmus institor
 Brachydesmus istanbulensis
 Brachydesmus jalzici
 Brachydesmus jeanelli
 Brachydesmus jubatus
 Brachydesmus kalischewskyi
 Brachydesmus karawajewi
 Brachydesmus langhofferi
 Brachydesmus lapadensis
 Brachydesmus lapidivagus
 Brachydesmus latzelii
 Brachydesmus likanus
 Brachydesmus ljubetensis
 Brachydesmus lobifer
 Brachydesmus macedonicus
 Brachydesmus magnus
 Brachydesmus margaritatus
 Brachydesmus mitis
 Brachydesmus nemilanus
 Brachydesmus novaki
 Brachydesmus parallelus
 Brachydesmus pereliae
 Brachydesmus perfidus
 Brachydesmus peristerensis
 Brachydesmus pigmentatus
 Brachydesmus polydesmoides
 Brachydesmus proximus
 Brachydesmus radewi
 Brachydesmus reversus
 Brachydesmus silvanus
 Brachydesmus spinosus
 Brachydesmus splitensis
 Brachydesmus strasseri
 Brachydesmus stygivagus
 Brachydesmus styricus
 Brachydesmus subterraneus
 Brachydesmus superus
 Brachydesmus talyschanus
 Brachydesmus televensis
 Brachydesmus tetevensis
 Brachydesmus topali
 Brachydesmus troglobius
 Brachydesmus umbraticus
 Brachydesmus velebiticus
 Brachydesmus vermosanus
 Brachydesmus yosemitensis

References

Polydesmida
Millipede genera